The 1949 Wisconsin Badgers football team represented the University of Wisconsin in the 1949 Big Nine Conference football season. Led by first-year head coach Ivy Williamson, the Badgers compiled an overall record of 5–3–1 with a mark of 3–2–1 in conference play, placing fourth in the Big Nine. Red Wilson was the team's MVP for the third consecutive season and also the team's captain.

Schedule

References

Wisconsin
Wisconsin Badgers football seasons
Wisconsin Badgers football